The Persian onager (Equus hemionus onager), also called the Persian wild ass or Persian zebra, is a subspecies of onager (Asiatic wild ass) native to Iran (Persia). It is listed as Endangered, with no more than 600 individuals left in the wild and only 30 individuals living within North American institutions.

Taxonomy and history

The Persian onager is also simply named  (گور) meaning "zebra" in Persian. "Onager" is from the Greek ὄναγρος (onagros), meaning "wild ass".

Sometimes, the term "onager" is reserved specifically for this subspecies. However, as the whole species of the Asiatic wild ass is known simply as onager, it now also serves as the Persian wild ass's scientific name, as well (Equus hemionus onager). Information on the basic biology of the subspecies and how it differs from others is lacking, which hampers conservation efforts.

Onagers used to be numerous from the Middle East to China. However, until the 19th century, their population has been reduced from several thousand to a few thousand. Currently, more than 600 Persian onagers are living in the wild.

Habitat and distribution
Persian wild asses are known to inhabit mountain steppes, semidesert, or desert plains. They are usually found in desert steppes. Their largest population is found in Khar Turan National Park.

Threats

The Persian onager is listed as endangered by IUCN Red List, as it is close to extinction. Currently, poaching for meat and hides, competition with livestock, and drought are the greatest threats to this species.

Conservation status

Asiatic wild asses are legally highly protected; hunting them is forbidden. The European Endangered Species Programme reserved for European Association of Zoos and Aquaria is helping save the Persian onager from extinction, by breeding them in captivity and reintroducing them to their former ranges, including in new locations once inhabited by Syrian onagers in Saudi Arabia, Israel, and Ukraine.

On August 30, 2014, Iranian officials reported that three Persian onagers were born in Khar Turan National Park reserve near Shahroud in Semnan province, where it also has the largest populations of the equids.

In captivity
A few Persian onagers are breeding in various zoos of Europe and the Middle East, such as Chester, Whipsnade, and Yotvata. The Smithsonian Conservation Biology Institute in Front Royal, Virginia, also breeds Persian onagers, including two born in June 2015. The first ever artificial insemination of any wild equid was in this species, and resulted in two Persian Onager foals at the Wilds conservation center in Southeastern Ohio, in collaboration with experts from the Smithsonian Conservation Biology Institute.

Introduction projects
Since 2003, Persian onagers have been introduced in Saudi Arabia, where the Syrian wild ass (E. h. hemippus) once lived. Introduced Persian onagers live in deserts foraging on grasses and branches or woodier plant material in dry seasons.

In 1968, 11 Persian and Turkmenian onagers were flown from their countries to Israel in exchange for mountain gazelles. These were bred in captivity at the Hai Bar Yotvata wildlife sanctuary. Together, they bred a few Persian/Turkmenian hybrids in Israel. Offspring were introduced into the wild in the Negev Mountains area, intended to replace the local subspecies gone extinct. The introduced onagers have since established a stable population around 200 individuals.

References

Onager
Mammals of Asia
Mammals of the Middle East
Fauna of Iran
Endangered fauna of Asia
Mammals described in 1785